The 21st Biathlon World Championships for men were held in 1985 for the second time in Ruhpolding, in the then West Germany. The 2nd women's world championships were held in Egg am Etzel, Switzerland.

Men's results

20 km individual

10 km sprint

4 × 7.5 km relay

Women's results

10 km individual

5 km sprint

3 × 5 km relay

Medal table

References

1985
Biathlon World Championships
International sports competitions hosted by West Germany
International sports competitions hosted by Switzerland
1985 in West German sport
1985 in Swiss sport
1985 in Bavaria
Biathlon competitions in Switzerland
February 1985 sports events in Europe
Biathlon competitions in Germany
Biathlon competitions in West Germany
Sports competitions in Bavaria